This is a list of notable bars, public houses and taverns. A bar is a retail business and drinking establishment that serves alcoholic beverages, such as beer, wine, liquor, cocktails, and other beverages such as mineral water and soft drinks and often sell snack foods such as crisps or peanuts, for consumption on premises.

Bars

 21 Club
 Abbey Lounge
 Booches
 Cafe D'Mongo's Speakeasy
 The Chatham
 Friar's Inn
 The Fours
 Giger Bar
 KGB
 Krazy Kat Klub
 Lucky Lou's
 Marie's Rip Tide Lounge
 The Queen's Head
 Tobacco Road
 Vesuvio Cafe

Biker bars

A biker bar is a bar that is frequented by motorcyclists (bikers). Some are owned or managed by people who are friendly toward motorcyclists. Biker bars are patronized by people from all walks of life, including bikers, non-bikers, and motorcycle club adherents, including outlaw motorcycle clubs.
 Ace Cafe 
 Cook's Corner 
 Full Throttle Saloon 
 Hogs and Heifers 
 Hurley Mountain Inn 
 Neptune's Net
 Strokers Dallas

Gastropubs
A gastropub is a bar and restaurant that serves high-end beer and food.

England

 The Hand & Flowers
 The Hinds Head
 The Old Bull and Bush
 Sir Charles Napier Inn

Taiwan
 TKK Fried Chicken – also has a location in China

United States
 The Spotted Pig

California
 Auburn Alehouse
 Father's Office

Ice bars

An ice bar, sometimes associated with an ice hotel is a drinking establishment primarily made of ice. The bars usually contain ice sculptures and other formations and are kept at low temperatures (generally about -5 °C) to hinder melting. The walls and seating are also usually made of ice. Mostly a novelty, the ice bar is often considered a tourist destination.
 Icebar Orlando
 Icehotel

Public houses

A pub, also referred to as "public house", is a house licensed to sell alcohol to the general public. It is a drinking establishment in Britain, Ireland, New Zealand, Canada, and Australia. In many places, especially in villages, a pub is the focal point of the community. Samuel Pepys described the pub as the heart of England.

By location

Afghanistan
 Irish Pub, Kabul

Australia

Brisbane

 Breakfast Creek Hotel 
 Empire Hotel, Fortitude Valley 
 Gambaro Group 
 Grand View Hotel 
 Jubilee Hotel 
 Norman Hotel 
 Normanby Hotel 
 Orient Hotel, Brisbane 
 Plough Inn 
 Regatta Hotel 
 Royal Exchange Hotel, Brisbane 
 Transcontinental Hotel 
 Victory Hotel 
 Wickham Hotel

Melbourne

 Corner Hotel
 Devonshire Arms, Fitzroy
 Empress Hotel, Fitzroy North
 Esplanade Hotel
 Punters Club
 The Tote Hotel
 Young and Jackson Hotel

Sydney

 Albion Hotel
 Bald Rock Hotel
 Beach Hotel
 Bowlers' Club of New South Wales
 Dick's Hotel
 Dry Dock Hotel
 Eastern Suburbs Leagues Club
 Exchange Hotel (Balmain)
 Forth & Clyde Hotel
 Grand Hotel – Broadway
 Jets Sports Club
 Kent Hotel
 Newport Arms Hotel
 North Sydney Leagues Club
 The Oriental Hotel
 Phoenician Club
 The Riverview Hotel, Balmain
 Royal Oak Hotel
 The Rugby Club
 Sandringham Hotel, Newtown
 Shipwright's Arms Hotel
 Sir William Wallace Hotel
 Star Hotel, Balmain
 UNSW Venues
 Volunteer Hotel
 White Bay Hotel
 White Horse Hotel, Surry Hills

Ireland
 List of pubs in Dublin

United Kingdom

England

 Anchor Inn
 Angel and Crown, Covent Garden
 The Blind Beggar
 The Crown Inn, Birmingham
 The Trout Inn

London
 List of pubs in London
 List of award-winning pubs in London

Sheffield

United States
 Isle of Skye
 Pig 'n Whistle
 The Cat & Fiddle

Former pubs

 Adam & Eve, Birmingham
 The Alexandra, New Barnet
 Bull and Crown, Chingford
 Fishmongers Arms
 Fleece Hotel
 Flying Horse Inn
 The Antelope Public House
 Lord High Admiral, Pimlico
 Lamb Hotel, Nantwich
 Queen's Head Tavern / Apollo Tavern

Micropubs

A micropub is a very small, one room public house. The concept is attributed to publican Martyn Hillier and his pub, The Butchers Arms, in Herne, Kent, England.

Pub chains
A pub chain is a group of pubs or bars with a brand image. The brand may be owned outright by one company, or there may be multiple financiers; the chain may be a division within a larger company, or may be a single operation.

 Antic Collective
 Bay Restaurant Group
 Belushi's
 Brewers Fayre
 Chef & Brewer
 Chicago Rock Cafe
 Eerie Pub Company
 Ettamogah Pub
 Firkin Brewery
 Inventive Leisure
 Mana Bar
 O'Neill's
 Punch Taverns
 Revolution Bar
 Scream Pubs
 Slug and Lettuce
 Spirit Group
 Spirit Pub Company
 Steamin' Billy
 Stonegate Pub Company
 Tynemill
 Varsity
 Walkabout
 Wetherspoons
 Yates's
 Young's

Mitchells & Butlers pub chains
Mitchells & Butlers runs around 1,600 managed public house, bars and restaurants throughout the United Kingdom.

 All Bar One
 Bass Brewery
 Harvester
 Innkeeper's Lodge
 Miller & Carter
 Mitchells & Butlers
 Mitchells & Butlers Brewery
 Mitchells & Butlers' Ground
 Nicholson's
 O'Neill's
 Phil Urban
 Toby Carvery

Saloons

 Comstock Saloon – located in San Francisco, California

Speakeasies
A speakeasy is an illicit establishment that  sells alcoholic beverages. Such establishments came into prominence in the United States during the Prohibition era (1920–1933, longer in some states). Speakeasies largely disappeared after Prohibition was ended in 1933, and the term is now used to describe some retro style bars. Some former speakeasies continue to operate as bars.
 The Blind Pig  Dublin Ireland
 Chumley's
 Delmonico's
 Dil Pickle Club
 Gallagher's Steakhouse
 KGB
 Krazy Kat Klub
 Light Horse Tavern
 Mystery Room
 PS AIR  Palm Springs ca.
 Tobacco Road

Taverns
A tavern is a place of business where people gather to drink alcoholic beverages and be served food, and in most cases, where travelers receive lodging. An inn is a tavern which has a license to put up guests as lodgers. The word derives from the Latin taberna whose original meaning was a shed, workshop, stall, or pub.

England
 Upper Flask

United States

 McGillin's Olde Ale House
 Nick's Original Big Train Bar
 Old Tavern

 Tun Tavern Brewery

Taverns in the American Revolution

 Alden Tavern Site 
 Buckman Tavern 
 Burnham Tavern 
 Cedar Bridge Tavern 
 City Tavern 
 Clifton House
 Fraunces Tavern 
 French Arms Tavern 
 Gabreil Daveis Tavern House 
 Golden Plough Tavern 
 Green Dragon Tavern 
 Hartwell Tavern
 Indian King Tavern 
 Mosby Tavern 
 Munroe Tavern 
 The Old 76 House 
 Peleg Arnold Tavern 
 Putnam Cottage 
 Raleigh Tavern 
 Red Lion Inn 
 Rising Sun Tavern 
 Rose and Crown Tavern 
 Smith Tavern 
 Three Pigeons 
 Tun Tavern 
 Warren Tavern 
 White Horse Tavern 
 Wright's Tavern

Tiki bars

A tiki bar is an exotic–themed drinking establishment that serves elaborate cocktails, especially rum-based mixed drinks such as the mai tai and zombie cocktail. These bars are aesthetically defined by their tiki culture décor which is based upon a romanticized conception of tropical cultures, most commonly Polynesian.
 Bahooka
 Bali Hai (Shelter Island)
 Jardin Tiki
 Kahiki Supper Club
 Mai-Kai Restaurant
 Sip 'n Dip Lounge
 The Hawaiian Inn
 Tiki Boyd's
 Tiki Ti
 Tonga Room
 Trader Sam's Enchanted Tiki Bar
 Trader Vic's

Wine bars

A wine bar, sometimes called a bodega, is a bar that principally or exclusively serves wine.
El Vino (London, UK)
Giant Cask (Bad Dürkheim, Germany)
Ordinaire (Oakland, California)
Vino Volo (San Francisco, California)
Zum Weinberg (Wismar, Germany)

See also
 List of microbreweries
 Types of drinking establishments

References

 
Drinking establishments
 
Bars